Gubanov (from губа meaning lip) is a Russian masculine surname, its feminine counterpart is Gubanova. It may refer to
Anastasia Vitalyevna Gubanova (born 2002), Russian singles figure skater
Anastasia Andreyevna Gubanova (born 2000), Russian pair figure skater
Igor Gubanov (born 1992), Russian football player 
Leonid Gubanov (poet) (1946-1983) - Soviet poet
Leonid Gubanov (1928-2004), Soviet Russian actor
Oleg Gubanov (born 1977), Russian football player

Russian-language surnames